Mikhail Andreevich Reisner (German: Michael von Reusner; 19 March 1868 – 3 August 1928) was a Russian and Soviet lawyer, jurist, writer, social psychologist and historian of Baltic German extraction. He was the father of writer Larissa Reisner and orientalist Igor Reisner, and adoptive father of naval officer and submariner Lev Reisner.

Biography 
Reisner was born in to an aristocratic family of Pomeranian origin. His father was a state official in the Vilna Governorate. He graduated from the Law Faculty of the University of Warsaw in 1893.

From 1893 to 1896, he taught, and in 1896 he was sent to Heidelberg, where he worked for two years. Between 1898 and 1903, he was appointed professor at the Faculty of Law of the University of Tomsk. During this period he published a strong critique of the Russian state's repressive policies vis-à-vis religion and civil society in the pages of Vestnik prava, a major Russian law journal. Reisner advocated for replacing the Polizeistaat model, which he considered outdated, with a "cultural rule-of-law state" that would guarantee the rights of the Empire's citizens, including freedom of conscience and religion. While his suggestions went largely unheeded at the time, he would remain interested in the subject of the separation of Church and State.

As a result of participating student riots in 1903, he had to resign, he was forced to emigrate to Germany and France. At the end of 1905, Reisner returned to Russia. Participated in the organisation of the First Conference of the Russian Social Democratic Labour Party in Tammerfors. After the defeat of the 1905 revolution, he again went abroad, lectured at the Russian Higher School of Social Sciences in Paris. Because of his Marxist views, he had to emigrate to Germany and France. In 1907, Reisner returned to the Russian Empire and became a lecturer at Saint Petersburg State University.

During World War I, together with his daughter Larisa, he produced the magazine "Rudin". After the October Revolution of 1917, he was appointed a professor at the University of Petrograd, where he helped to develop the first Soviet constitution. He was also the main author of the Decree on the Separation of Church and State.

Reisner was one of the founders of the Communist Academy as a center of Marxist social science. Reisner was also one of the founders of the Russian Psychoanalytical Society and worked in the People's Commissariat for Education and the People's Commissariat of Justice. Until his death, Reisner taught as a professor in the Moscow State University.

Mikhail Reisner passed away in 1928, and his ashes were buried at the Donskoye cemetery. His daughter Larisa had died two years earlier, while his adoptive son Lev perished in a camp in 1941, being rehabilitated under Khrushchev. His son Igor, however, went on to have a distinguished career in Soviet academia.

References

 

1868 births
1928 deaths
People from Vileyka District
People from Vilna Governorate
Russian people of German descent
Russian lawyers
University of Warsaw alumni
Academic staff of Saint Petersburg State University
Soviet people of German descent
Soviet jurists
Academic staff of Moscow State University
Russian Marxists
Burials at Donskoye Cemetery